is a Japanese voice actress who is currently affiliated with Stardas 21. She was formerly affiliated with Aoni Production.  She has graduated from the Doshisha Women's College of Liberal Arts, which is a private college for women.

Filmography
Major roles are highlighted in bold.

Dubbing Work

Live Action Films
 Inside Man - Madge (Kandiss Edmundson)

Live Action Television
 Without a Trace - Linda (Season 5)

References

External links
 

1977 births
Living people
Voice actresses from Nara Prefecture
Japanese voice actresses
21st-century Japanese actresses
Aoni Production voice actors
Doshisha Women's College of Liberal Arts alumni